Deportivo Sebaco was a Nicaraguan football team currently playing in the Nicaraguan Primera División. They are based in Sebaco.

History
The club was founded in 2014.  In 2016, Deportivo Sebaco won promotion to the Primera Division for the very first time by defeating ART Municipal Jalapa in a promotion relegation playoff.  .

Achievements
Segunda División de Nicaragua: 1
2016 Clausura

List of Coaches
  TBD
  Óscar Castillo

External links
  – La Prensa

Football clubs in Nicaragua
association football clubs established in 2014
association football clubs disestablished in 2018